The Roman Catholic Church in Haiti (Greater Antilles) consists only of a Latin hierarchy, joint in the national Episcopal Conference of Haiti, comprising two ecclesiastical provinces, each headed by a Metropolitan Archbishop, with a total of each suffragan dioceses, each headed by a bishop.

There are no Eastern Catholic, pre-diocesan or other exempt jurisdictions.

There are no titular sees. All defunct jurisdictions have current successor sees.

There is an Apostolic Nunciature to Haiti as papal diplomatic representation (embassy-level) in the national capital Port-au-Prince.

Current Latin dioceses

Ecclesiastical province of Cap-Haïtien
 Metropolitan Archdiocese of Cap-Haïtien
 Roman Catholic Diocese of Fort-Liberté
 Roman Catholic Diocese of Hinche
 Roman Catholic Diocese of Les Gonaïves
 Roman Catholic Diocese of Port-de-Paix

Ecclesiastical province of Port-au-Prince 
 Metropolitan Archdiocese of Port-au-Prince
 Diocese of Anse-à-Veau and Miragoâne
 Roman Catholic Diocese of Jacmel
 Roman Catholic Diocese of Jérémie
 Roman Catholic Diocese of Les Cayes

See also 
 List of Catholic dioceses (structured view)
 Catholic Church in Haiti

References

Sources and external links 
 GCatholic.org - data for all sections.
 Catholic-Hierarchy entry.

Catholic Church in Haiti

Haiti
Catholic dioceses

fr:Liste des évêques haïtiens#Organisation de l'Église à Haïti